Nolan Ryan Field is a baseball venue located in Kingsville, TX and has been the home of the TAMU-Kingsville Javalinas baseball team since 1994. The Javalinas are a member of the Lone Star Conference. The ballpark holds a capacity of 4,000 and was named after the MLB career strikeout leader and Texas pitching legend, Nolan Ryan, who aided in gathering the capital that built the stadium. In essence, this is "the house that Nolan Ryan built."

References

 

Baseball venues in Texas
Texas A&M–Kingsville Javelinas baseball